Lloyd Wells is an American jazz guitarist, composer and arranger.

Music career
He grew up in Laurel, Mississippi, the home town of jazz guitarist, Mundell Lowe. He did his first professional work playing for square dances while still attending high school. He attended the University of Southern Mississippi, graduating with a degree in Music Education.

With encouragement from Lowe, Wells spent the years 1964–73 in New York as a working guitarist. He moved to Nashville in 1974 and for seventeen years accompanied Tennessee Ernie Ford. He also worked with Brenda Lee and Porter Wagoner. For twenty-three years, he was music director of Opryland USA, where he wrote over five thousand arrangements.

References

Further reading
 "Mundell Lowe" by Ed Benson.  Just Jazz Guitar, November, 2007, page 149.

American jazz guitarists
Guitarists from Mississippi
Living people
People from Englewood, New Jersey
1938 births
20th-century American guitarists
Jazz musicians from Mississippi